WWMI (1380 AM) is a radio station broadcasting a Catholic talk format, as an affiliate of Relevant Radio. Licensed to St. Petersburg, Florida, United States, the station serves the Tampa Bay Area. The station is owned by Relevant Radio, Inc.

History

On April 3, 1939, the Federal Communications Commission awarded a construction permit to the Pinellas Broadcasting Company to build a new radio station on 1370 kHz in St. Petersburg, broadcasting with 250 watts during the day and 100 at night. Originally WBOX but changed to WTSP ("Welcome to St. Petersburg") before launch, the station launched on the morning of November 30. In the same year it was founded, Pinellas Broadcasting was sold to Paul and Nelson Poynter, who owned the St. Petersburg Times.

On March 29, 1941, NARBA reallocation moved WTSP to 1380 kHz; later that year, the station was approved for an increase to 1,000 watts day and 500 watts night and became the first Tampa Bay affiliate of the Mutual Broadcasting System. In late 1946, construction began on a new 5,000-watt facility near the southern approach to the Gandy Bridge, which would also house an FM station. By 1954, WTSP-FM 102.5, established in 1948, had been upgraded to broadcast with 77,000 watts. That same year, however, the station lost in its fight to win a television station on channel 8; rival newspaper The Tampa Tribune and its WFLA were given the nod to build WFLA-TV.

In 1956, Ferris, Joe and Sam Rahall—natives of Beckley, West Virginia, but whose parents were longtime winter residents of St. Petersburg—purchased WTSP AM and FM from the Times for $200,000. The Rahalls opted to dismantle the FM operation, surrendering the license in December. Seeking to update the station "in the modern trend", WTSP became WLCY on July 15, 1959. The new name gave rise to the station's new moniker, "Radio Elsie".

For many years, WLCY was the Tampa Bay area's premier rock and roll station, with offices, studios, and transmitter in the previous WTSP facility on Gandy Boulevard near 4th Street North. The station later shared space with Rahall's WLCY-TV and the new WLCY-FM at the "Rahall Color Communications Center", just east of the original Gandy site. The name of the licensee changed to WLCY, Inc., on June 20, 1963 and then to the Rahall Communications Corporation on October 3, 1969. WLCY began to identify dual city of license as "St. Petersburg-Tampa" in 1976.

Rahall began to divest itself of its Tampa Bay properties, and in September 1978, Florida Radio, Inc. became the station's new owner. WLCY moved out of the TV building and back into the old WTSP studios.

In 1981, the station was sold to Harte-Hanks and was changed to WNSI (News, Sports and Information). In 1983, after Edens Broadcasting bought the station, it became WRBQ, and flipped to a simulcast of Q105. This simulcast would last until January 1992, when WRBQ flipped to the satellite-fed Urban AC format known as "The Touch" and picked up Tom Joyner to host mornings. In July of that year, Edens sold WRBQ-AM-FM to Clear Channel Communications. In February 1999, ABC Radio bought the station and it became WWMI and adopted the Radio Disney format on May 3 of that year.

On August 13, 2014, Disney put WWMI and twenty-two other Radio Disney stations up for sale, in order to focus more on digital distribution of the Radio Disney network.

On September 15, 2015, it was announced that Salem Media Group acquired the last five Radio Disney owned-and-operated stations for sale (including WWMI) for $2.225 million. WWMI was acquired through South Texas Broadcasting, Inc., for $750.000. The sale of WWMI was completed on December 11, 2015.

On December 14, 2015, the station became Salem's Wall Street Business Network affiliate in Tampa Bay. WWMI is now one of two stations in the market airing a business news/talk format, the other being WHFS.

On July 25, 2019, Salem Media Group agreed to sell WWMI and WLCC, as well as WKAT and WZAB in the Miami market, to Immaculate Heart Media, Inc. for more than $8.2 million.  On May 17, 2021, WWMI switched to the English-language version of Relevant Radio.

References

Radio Years, Central Florida's Great Radio Stations of the Past

External links

Relevant Radio stations
Radio stations established in 1939
1939 establishments in Florida
Former subsidiaries of The Walt Disney Company
WMI